Stephan Thomae (born 19 June 1968) is a German lawyer and politician of the Free Democratic Party (FDP) who has been serving as a member of the Bundestag from the state of Bavaria from 2009 till 2013 and since 2017.

Early life and career 
After graduating from the humanistic Carl-von-Linde-Gymnasium Kempten, Thomae did his military service. He then studied history and law, which he completed in 1993 as Magister Artium and in 1995 with the first state examination in law. 

Since Thomae passed his second state examination in 1998, he has been working as a lawyer.

Political career 
Thomae first became a member of the Bundestag in the 2009 German federal election. In parliament, he served on the Committee on Legal Affairs and Consumer Protection; its Subcommittee on European Affairs; the Budget Committee; and the Audit Committee.

Thomae became a member of the Bundestag again in the 2017 German federal election. He has since been serving as deputy chairman of the FDP parliamentary group under the leadership of chairman Christian Lindner. He also joined the Committee for the Scrutiny of Acoustic Surveillance of the Private Home and the Parliamentary Oversight Panel (PKGr), which provides parliamentary oversight of Germany's intelligence services BND, BfV and MAD.

In addition to his committee assignments, Thomae is part of the German-Ukrainian Parliamentary Friendship Group.

In the negotiations to form a so-called traffic light coalition of the Social Democrats (SPD), the Green Party and the FDP following the 2021 federal elections, Thomae led his party's delegation in the working group on children, youth and families; his co-chairs from the other parties are Serpil Midyatli and Katrin Göring-Eckardt.

Since 2022, Thomas has been serving on the parliamentary body in charge of appointing judges to the Highest Courts of Justice, namely the Federal Court of Justice (BGH), the Federal Administrative Court (BVerwG), the Federal Fiscal Court (BFH), the Federal Labour Court (BAG), and the Federal Social Court (BSG). That same year, he joined the Commission for the Reform of the Electoral Law and the Modernization of Parliamentary Work, co-chaired by Johannes Fechner and Nina Warken.

Other activities 
 Kempten University of Applied Sciences, Member of the Board of Trustees (since 2022)
 Augsburg University of Applied Sciences, Member of the Board of Trustees
 German Foundation for International Legal Cooperation (IRZ), Member
 Amnesty International, Member

References

External links 

  
 Bundestag biography 
 

 

 

1968 births
Living people
Members of the Bundestag for Bavaria
Members of the Bundestag 2021–2025
Members of the Bundestag 2017–2021
Members of the Bundestag 2009–2013
Members of the Bundestag for the Free Democratic Party (Germany)
People from Kempten im Allgäu